"No Drama" is a song recorded by American singer Tinashe featuring guest vocals from American rapper Offset. It was released commercially for digital download via RCA Records on January 18, 2018, as the lead single from Tinashe's third studio album, Joyride (2018).

Background
The song was first revealed in a picture Tinashe posted on social media on January 12, 2018.

Critical reception
Jon Blistein of Rolling Stone described the song as "brash", writing that it features "heavy bass and light-yet-sinister synths and crisp percussion". Rania Aniftos of Billboard mentioned that the song is "powerful" and "glamorous". Mike Nied of Idolator stated: "The track signifies a retreat to more comfortable ground after searching for crossover appeal with saccharine releases like "Player," "Superlove" and "Flame." Instead, Tinashe hops on a fierce production to drop some brag-heavy verses."

Live performances
Tinashe performed No Drama on Good Morning America on April 6, 2018 and the Tonight Show Starring Jimmy Fallon on April 12, 2018.

Credits and personnel
Adapted from Tidal.
Tinashe – lead vocals, songwriting
Stargate – songwriting, production
Offset – songwriting
Jaycen Joshua – mixing engineering
Maddox Chhim – engineering assistant
Dave Nakaji – engineering assistant
Chris Athens – mastering

Charts

References

2018 singles
2018 songs
RCA Records singles
Tinashe songs
Offset (rapper) songs
Songs written by Offset (rapper)
Songs written by Tinashe
Songs written by Tor Erik Hermansen
Songs written by Mikkel Storleer Eriksen
Song recordings produced by Stargate (record producers)